The University of Nice Sophia Antipolis was a university located in Nice, France and neighboring areas. It was founded in 1965 and was organized in eight faculties, two autonomous institutes and an engineering school. It was merged in 2019 into the Côte d'Azur University.

It also hosts the first WWW Interactive Multipurpose Server.

It is a member of the Coordination of French Research-Intensive Universities, the equivalent of the Russell Group in the UK.

History

The University of Nice was officially established by decree dated October 23, 1965. However, it has roots that go back to the 17th century, with the Collegium Jurisconsultorum Niciensium created in 1639 by the Princes of Savoy. In the 17th century, courses were taught at its College of Medicine.

The University of Nice's vocation was asserted at the beginning of the 20th century, thanks to the combined efforts of several university members, such as the Dean Louis Trotabas and Maurice Mignon. In 1933 with the help of local communities and the City of Nice in particular, they created the Centre Universitaire Méditerranéen (currently a conference center) situated on the Promenade des Anglais whose first Administrator was the  French poet, Paul Valéry. Following that, the Institut d'Etudes Juridiques was established In 1938, the Institut d'Etudes Littéraires in 1941, and the Institut d'Etudes Scientifiques in 1945.  La Faculté de Droit et des Sciences Economiques (The College of Law and Economics) was created by decree on August 2, 1962 and was connected to the Université d'Aix-Marseille.

Campus

The university has four main campuses: the Valrose campus (Sciences), the Trotabas campus (Law), the Saint-Jean d'Angély campus (Economics and Management), and the Carlone campus (Letters, Arts and Humanities).

However, the university operates on several secondary locations like Sophia Antipolis or Villefranche-sur-Mer outside Nice.

Academics

Units of formation and research 
Law, Political, Economic and Management Sciences 
Institute of Law, Peace and Development 
Spaces and Cultures 
Letters, Arts and Social sciences 
Medicine 
Odontology 
Sciences 
Sciences and Technology of Physical and Sporting Activities

Institutes
IAE Nice Graduate School of Management
University Institute of Technology 
School of engineers 
University Polytechnic School - Polytech Nice-Sophia
Laboratoire de Zététique
Institute of the Right of Peace and Development (IDPD)
Centre de la Méditerranée Moderne et Contemporaine, which produces the academic journal , 

The university's Institute of Languages also provides lectures and summer courses in French to foreign students.

Notable alumni
Alphabetically by surname:
Yukiya Amano - Japanese diplomat, Director General of IAEA
Robert B. Asprey – American military historian and author
William Boyd – Scottish novelist writer
Nicolae Ceaușescu – Romanian dictator (honorary degree, 1975)
Adrian Constantin – Romanian-Austrian mathematician 
Simon Critchley – English philosopher
Driss Dahak – Moroccan diplomat, General Secretary of the Government
Noah Dana-Picard – Israeli mathematician, professor, and Talmudic scholar
Odile Hembise Fanton d’Andon. CEO of the ACRI-ST
 Jean-Lou Justine – parasitologist and zoologist
 Philippe Kahn - mathematician, technology innovator and entrepreneur
Jean-Marie Gustave Le Clézio – writer, Nobel Prize in Literature
Philippe Mariani – British entrepreneur
Zita Martins – Portuguese astrobiologist
Mohammed VI – King of Morocco
 Tomer Sisley – Israeli humorist, actor, screenwriter, comedian, and film director
Fatoumata Tambajang – Vice-President of the Gambia
Gilles Tonelli – Monegasque engineer, diplomat and politician
Zeine Ould Zeidane – Former Prime Minister of Mauritania

See also
List of early modern universities in Europe

References

External links

 University of Nice Website
Sophia Antipolis Technology Park Website
WWW Interactive Multipurpose Server at wims.unice.fr
University International of Nice Website

Universities and colleges in Nice
Universities in Provence-Alpes-Côte d'Azur
Education in Villefranche-sur-Mer
Buildings and structures in Villefranche-sur-Mer
Educational institutions established in 1965
1965 establishments in France